The 2017–18 Yale Bulldogs women's basketball team represented Yale University during the 2017–18 NCAA Division I women's basketball season. The Bulldogs, led by third year head coach Allison Guth, played their home games at John J. Lee Amphitheater of the Payne Whitney Gymnasium as members of the Ivy League.

They finished the season at 19–13, 8–6 for fourth place in the Ivy League, which afforded them a spot in the conference playoff for a bid in the NCAA tournament. However, they were defeated in the first round by Princeton. The Bulldogs were then invited to the WBI, and they went on to win the championship, the first Ivy League team to win a postseason tournament.

Previous season
They finished the season 15–12, 6–8 in Ivy League play to finish in  sixth place.

Roster

Schedule

|-
!colspan=9 style=| Non-conference regular season

|-
!colspan=9 style=| Ivy League regular season

|-
!colspan=9 style=| Ivy League Women's Tournament

|-
!colspan=9 style=| WBI

See also
 2017–18 Yale Bulldogs men's basketball team

References

Yale
Yale Bulldogs women's basketball seasons
Yale Bulldogs
Yale Bulldogs
Yale
Women's Basketball Invitational championship seasons